Burchiello (1404–1449) was the pen name of an Italian poet, born Domenico di Giovanni. He is notable for his paradoxical style and the apparently absurd usages of his sonnets, which founded a school of writing and were much imitated.

Life and career
Born in Florence, his father Giovanni was a carpenter and his mother Antonia a spinner. He did not attend school and worked as a barber on via Calimala - as such he belonged to the Corporazione dei Medici e degli Speziali, the same guild as Dante Alighieri. A literary and artistic circle including Leon Battista Alberti attended his barbershop, also frequented by those who opposed the excessive power of the Medici family.

In 1434, the same year as Cosimo il Vecchio's return from his Venetian exile, Burchiello fled Florence, most probably due to financial problems and to escape loan sharks, although some critics state he was exiled by Cosimo for his hostility to the Medici. He traveled to Sienna, where he was imprisoned for a few months in 1439 due to three fines, one for theft, one for a quarrel over a love affair and one for a professional dispute. In 1443 he opened a new barbershop in Rome, but died in poverty shortly after his arrival.

Poetry alla burchia

The Burchiello tradition

References

Bibliography (in Italian) 
 Giuseppe Crimi (ed.), 30 sonetti del Burchiello, Viareggio, Diaforia, Edizioni Cinquemarzo, 2016.
 Giuseppe Crimi (ed.), L'oscura lingua e il parlar sottile: tradizione e fortuna del Burchiello, Roma, Vecchiarelli, 2005.
 Michelangelo Zaccarello (ed.), " I sonetti del Burchiello", Torino, Einaudi, 2004.
 Michelangelo Zaccarello (ed.), "La fantasia fuor de' confini - Burchiello e dintorni a 550 anni dalla morte", Ediz. di Storia e Letteratura, Roma, 2002.

External links (in Italian) 
 (PDF) Il testo delle Rime di Burchiello secondo l'edizione critica di Michelangelo Zaccarello
 
 https://gutenberg.beic.it/webclient/DeliveryManager?pid=1547853&custom_att_2=simple_viewer&search_terms=DTL8&pds_handle=
 http://www.treccani.it/enciclopedia/domenico-di-giovanni-detto-il-burchiello_(Dizionario_Biografico)/
 

1404 births
1449 deaths
Writers from Florence
15th-century Italian poets